Augustin Bey (born 6 June 1995) is a French track and field athlete who competes in the long jump. He qualified for the long jump at the 2020 Summer Olympics. He also won the event at the 2019 and 2021 French Athletics Championships, as well as at the 2020 French Indoor Athletics Championships. He also tied for the bronze medal with Eusebio Cáceres at the 2021 European Athletics Team Championships.

References

1995 births
Living people
French male long jumpers
French Athletics Championships winners
People from Sarrebourg
Athletes (track and field) at the 2020 Summer Olympics
Olympic athletes of France
Athletes (track and field) at the 2022 Mediterranean Games
Mediterranean Games gold medalists for France
Mediterranean Games gold medalists in athletics
Sportspeople from Moselle (department)